Proto-Euphratean is a hypothetical unclassified language or languages which was considered by some Assyriologists (for example, Samuel Noah Kramer) to be the substratum language of the people who introduced farming into Southern Iraq in the Early Ubaid period (5300–4700 BC).

Dyakonov and Ardzinba identified these hypothetical languages with the Samarran culture.

Benno Landsberger and other Assyriologists argued that by examining the structure of Sumerian names of occupations, as well as toponyms and hydronyms, one can suggest that there was once an earlier group of people in the region who spoke an entirely different language, often referred to as Proto-Euphratean. Terms for "farmer", "smith", "carpenter", and "date" (the fruit) do not appear to have a Sumerian or Semitic origin.

Igor Dyakonov and Vladislav Ardzinba proposed a different term, "banana languages", based on a characteristic feature of multiple personal names attested in Sumerian texts, namely reduplication of syllables (as in the English word banana): Inanna, Zababa, Chuwawa/Humbaba, Bunene, Pazuzu, etc found in Sumerian, Akkadian, Assyrian and Babylonian texts. The same feature was attested in some other unclassified languages, including Minoan. The same feature is allegedly attested by several names of Hyksos rulers: although the Hyksos tribes were Semitic Canaanites, some of their names, like Bnon, Apophis, etc. were apparently non-Semitic in origin.

Rubio challenged the substratum hypothesis, arguing that there is evidence of borrowing from more than one language. This theory is now predominant in the field (Piotr Michalowski, Gerd Steiner, etc.).

A related proposal by Gordon Whittaker is that the language of the proto-literary texts from the Late Uruk period ( 3350–3100 BC) is an early Indo-European language that he terms "Euphratic", although this does not have mainstream support.

References

Literature 

fix
 Vanseveren, Sylvia. "A "New" Ancient Indo-European Language? On Assumed Linguistic Contacts between Sumerian and Indo-European "Euphratic"". In: The Journal of Indo-European Studies (JIES). Vol. 36, Nº. 3-4 (FALL/WINTER), 2008: pp. 371-382. .

Sumerian language
Unclassified languages of Asia
Extinct languages of Asia
Hypothetical languages
Ubaid period